Jane Long was an English stage actor of the seventeenth century. She was recruited into the Duke's Company after the theatres were repopened following the Restoration and became a noted comedienne, at a time when the Restoration comedy genre was flourishing.

Selected roles
 Laughing Jane in The Cutter of Coleman Street by Abraham Cowley (1661)
 Flora in The Adventures of Five Hours by Samuel Tuke (1663)
 Diacelia in The Slighted Maid by Robert Stapylton (1663)
 Brianella in The Stepmother by Robert Stapylton (1663)
 Widow in The Comical Revenge by George Etheredge (1664)
 Leucippe in The Rivals by William Davenant (1664)
 Zarma in Mustapha by Roger Boyle (1665)
 Mandanda in The Women's Conquest by Edward Howard (1670)
 Mrs Brittle in The Amorous Widow by Thomas Betterton (1670)
 Crispina in The Six Days' Adventure by Edward Howard (1671)
 Fickle in The Town Shifts by Edward Revet (1671)
 Paulina in Juliana by John Crowne (1671)
 Osiris in Cambyses, King Of Persia by Elkanah Settle (1671)
 Betty Rash in The Morning Ramble by Henry Nevil Payne (1673)

References

Bibliography
 Howe, Elizabeth. The First English Actresses: Women and Drama, 1660–1700. Cambridge University Press, 1992.
 Pritchard, R.E. Scandalous Liaisons: Charles II and his Court. Amberley Publishing Limited,  2015.

17th-century English people
English stage actresses
17th-century English actresses
Year of birth unknown
Year of death unknown